39 (thirty-nine) is the natural number following 38 and preceding 40.

In mathematics 

39 is the sum of five consecutive primes (3 + 5 + 7 + 11 + 13) and also is the product of the first and the last of those consecutive primes. Among small semiprimes only three other integers (10, 155, and 371) share this attribute.  39 also is the sum of the first three powers of 3 (3 + 3 + 3). Given 39, the Mertens function returns 0.
39 is the smallest natural number which has three partitions into three parts which all give the same product when multiplied: {25, 8, 6}, {24, 10, 5}, {20, 15, 4}.
39 is the 12th distinct semiprime and the 4th in the {3×q} family. It is the last member of the third distinct semiprime pair (38,39).
39 has an aliquot sum of 17 which is a prime. 39 is the 4th member of the 17-aliquot tree. It is a perfect totient number.
The thirteenth Perrin number is 39, which comes after 17, 22, 29 (it is the sum of the first two mentioned).
Since the greatest prime factor of 392 + 1 = 1522 is 761, which is more than 39 twice, 39 is a Størmer number.
The F26A graph is a symmetric graph with 39 edges.

In science
The atomic number of yttrium

Astronomy
Messier object Open Cluster M39, a magnitude 5.5 open cluster in the constellation Cygnus
The New General Catalogue object NGC 39, a spiral galaxy in the constellation Andromeda

In religion
The number of the 39 categories of activity prohibited on Shabbat according to Halakha
The number of mentions of work or labor in the Torah
The actual number of lashes given by the Sanhedrin to a person meted the punishment of 40 lashes
The number of books in the Old Testament according to Protestant canon
The number of statements on Anglican Church doctrine, Thirty-Nine Articles

In other fields

Arts and entertainment
In the title of the John Buchan novel and subsequent films (one by Alfred Hitchcock), The Thirty-Nine Steps
The age American comedian Jack Benny claimed to be for more than 40 years
"39" is a song by The Cure on their album Bloodflowers
"39" is a song by Tenacious D on their album Rize of the Fenix
"'39" is a song by Queen on their album A Night at the Opera
The book series The 39 Clues revolves around 39 clues hidden around the world
Glorious 39 is a 2009 drama film set at the beginning of World War II
In the CBS reality show Survivor, contestants compete for 39 days
The number of episodes done during its one season in 1955–1956 of The Honeymooners television series is commonly referred to as the "Classic 39"
Japanese wordplay and slang:
Internet chat slang for "Thank You" when written with numbers (3=San, 9=Kyuu)
This number is also considered to be the lucky number of Hatsune Miku due to the digits 3 and 9 being pronounceable as "mi" and "ku", respectively.

History
The number of signers to the United States Constitution, out of 55 members of the Philadelphia Convention delegates
The traditional number of times citizens of Ancient Rome hit their slaves when beating them, referred to as "Forty save one"
The duration, in nanoseconds, of the nuclear reaction in the largest nuclear explosion ever performed (Tsar Bomba)
The number of Scud missiles which Iraq fired at Israel during the Gulf War in 1991
Number of bodies found in a refrigerated articulated lorry in Grays, Essex, United Kingdom 2019
The code for international direct-dialed phone calls to Italy

Pier 39 in San Francisco
The number of the French department Jura
In Afghanistan, the number 39 is considered unlucky, due to the belief that it is associated with pimps. See Curse of 39.
The bowling lane normally consists of 39 wooden boards

See also
 List of highways numbered 39

References

Integers